Japanese–Vietnamese relations are over a millennium old, and the establishment of friendly trade relations can be traced to at least the 16th century. Modern relations between the two countries are based on Vietnam's developing economy and Japan's role as an investor and foreign aid donor.

Country comparison

History

Early contact 

In the 8th century, Abe no Nakamaro, a descendant of the Imperial House of Japan, entered the Chinese civil service under the Tang dynasty and eventually served as governor (jiedushi) of Annam from 761 to 767. 

During the 8th century, the Japanese court composite ritual art comprising orchestral music and dance (Bugaku) known as Rinyu-gaku is said to have been introduced by a foreign monk named "Buttetsu" (Phật Triết) who came from Rinyu (Chăm Pa).

An archaeological dig in Kyūshū, the most southwesterly of the four main islands of Japan, revealed fragments of a Vietnamese ceramic with the inscribed date of 1330, but ended in 1332.

16th to 17th century 

 

As early as the 16th century, contact between Japan and Vietnam came in the form of trade and bartering. Along with Siam (Thailand) and Malaysia, Japanese red seal ships frequented Vietnamese ports. Vietnamese records show that when the port of Hội An was opened by Lord Nguyễn Hoàng in the early 17th century, hundreds of Japanese traders were already residing there.

Vietnamese traders bought silver, copper and bronze from Japan in exchange for Vietnamese silk, sugar, spices and sandalwood, which fetched a huge profit back in Japan. In order to handle the influx of traders, a Japanese district called Nihonmachi was set up at Hội An. The metals trade was vital to the Nguyen lords, for they needed coins for commerce and bronze to cast guns.

The two countries enjoyed a warm degree of friendship. Shōgun Tokugawa Ieyasu exchanged amicable letters and gifts with Lord Nguyen. His son Lord Nguyễn Phúc Nguyên would marry his daughter Princess Ngoc Khoa to Araki Shutaro, an eminent Japanese trader.

An aggregate of 34 letters were exchanged between the Tokugawa Shogunate and what the Japanese referred to as An Nam Quốc (安南國), of these letters 15 came from the Tokugawa Shogunate and 19 from the Nguyễn lords based in Quảng Nam. This made Vietnam one of the Asian countries that the Tokugawa Shogunate corresponded with the most during this period.

When Japan entered a period of self-isolation, trade continued to flow, either through the planning of permanent residents or through intermediary Dutch merchants. However, in 1685 the Tokugawa shogunate became aware of the nation's overexploited silver and copper mines, and a trade restriction was put in place. Due to the importance of these metals, the new regulations dampened trade between Japan and Vietnam, as well as much of South Asia. 

Despite officially isolating itself from the outside world, references to Vietnamese–Japanese relations can still be found, the Chronicle Đại Nam Thực Lục Tiền Biên written during the 19th century makes references to Japanese trading vessels engaged in commercial operations in both the provinces of Gia Định and Biên Hòa in 1679. On the 22nd page of the 5th volume of the Đại Nam Thực Lục Tiền Biên it notes: "Warships commanded by (Duong) Ngạn Địch and Hoàng Tiến came to the Bàn Lân hamlet (now in Biên Hòa province) via the Lôi Lạp estuary (now in Gia Định province). They reclaimed fallow land and built towns where trading vessels from the Qing Empire, western countries, Japan, and Java flocked." This indicates that trade between the two countries existed even after the sakoku policy was enacted.

19th to 20th century

19th century 

A report dated the 10th day of the 12th month of the 16th year of Gia Long's reign (1817) assembled by Lê Tông Chất (the Imperial Delegate for the Northern region) mentioned the tale of five Vietnamese drifters who, while travelling from Gia Định (modern-day Ho Chi Minh City) to Huế, drifted ashore to Japan. The report noted that these soldiers left the city of Gia Định in the middle of 1815 and after a short while ended up in Japan, these soldiers were rescued and supported by local Japanese residents and officials and ended up returning to Vietnam through the Trấn Nam Quan border gate in 1817 after traveling through Qing China. 

With the Meiji restoration in 1868, Japan adopted a more outward-facing foreign policy, part of which eventually involved more active diplomacy and trade with French Indochina, the colonial state that contained the territory of present-day Vietnam. While Japan's economic transformation and colonial expansion in Asia secured its subjects' elevated legal status abroad (especially in European colonies like French Indochina where one's race was a factor in legal status), it also attracted the attention of colonialism's opponents. A number of Vietnamese nationalists became drawn to Japan after its 1905 victory in the Russo-Japanese War, as Phan Bội Châu encouraged Vietnamese youth to travel to Japan and study in preparation for revolution against the French colonial government in what was called the Đông Du movement; among these students was Cường Để, heir to the throne of the Nguyễn dynasty. The Russo-Japanese War had created diplomatic tension between France and Japan due to France's closeness to Russia throughout the conflict, leading to the Franco-Japanese Treaty of 1907. The treaty improved relations between Japan and French Indochina, prompting Japan to crackdown on Vietnamese students in the Đong Du movement who by 1910 had either fled Japan or been deported, including Cường Để who, like Phan Bôi Châu, escaped into self-imposed exile.

Japanese women called Karayuki-san migrated to cities like Hanoi, Haiphong and Saigon in colonial French Indochina in the late 19th century to work as prostitutes and provide sexual services to French soldiers who were occupying Vietnam since the French viewed Japanese women as clean they were highly popular. Images of the Japanese prostitutes in Vietnam were put on French postcards by French photographers. The Japanese government tried to hide the existences of these Japanese prostitutes who went abroad and do not mention them in books on history. 

During the 19th century the Đại Việt sử ký toàn thư was distributed in Japan. In 1883 Toshiaki Hikida, a military officer of the General Staff Office of the Japanese Imperial Army, was assigned his post in Vietnam, during his stay there a local mandarin in Hanoi would give him a copy of the Đại Việt sử ký toàn thư which after returning to Japan in 1884 he would publish and reprint there. Afterward, Hikida's version of the Đại Việt sử ký toàn thư would become widely circulated outside of Vietnam.

World War I
 
On 27 August 1914 Japan officially entered the World War I on the side of the allies (also known as the Entente Powers), Japan invaded and took the German colony of Tsingtao and the rest of the Kiautschou Bay Leased Territory. In November 1914 Japan would supplant the German sphere of influence in southern China with its own political and economic influence making putting it in direct competition with French Indochina. Even though the Japanese openly supported a number of anti-French secessionist movements, such as Prince Cường Để's Duy Tân Hội, the French situation in Europe was bad enough for prime minister Georges Clemenceau to ask the Japanese for their help. 

The war situation in Europe so bad that in 1914 the French considered exchanging French Indochina with Japan for both financial and military support, but this idea was quickly abandoned. 

Clemenceau asked the Empire of Japan to aid them with the transportation of the travailleurs et tirailleurs indochinois to Europe and by sending its own forces to help fight in Europe. Clemenceau also wanted the Japanese help intervene in Siberia to fight the Bolshevik forces during the Russian civil war to prevent the loss of the many French-Russian loans, which were important for the French post-war economy. 

On the 10th day of the 11th month of the 2nd year of Khải Định's reign (1917) the Viện cơ mật reported on a Tokyo College of Law textbook offered by the Governor-General of French Indochina to the Nguyễn dynasty government, that was translated into Chinese.

In 1918 the idea of selling French Indochina to Japan was raised again and like the first time that it was proposed it was abandoned again. 

Both during and after the war the economic relations between France and Japan strengthened as Japan became a creditor of France following the latter's financial difficulties Which came as a result of the war.

Joint French-Japanese administration of Vietnam 
 

In June 1940, France fell to Nazi Germany which led to the creation of the puppet Vichy regime to which the government of French Indochina remained loyal, motivated in part by a desire not to antagonize Japan who by then occupied the Chinese territory directly bordering Indochina. French Indochina's new alignment with Axis nations could not fully prevent Japanese aggression, however, as Japan was willing to use military force against French Indochina in order to achieve its strategic goals in the region. On 22 September 1940, Japan invaded Vietnam in a limited conflict that secured privileges to station large numbers of troops in Tonkin as well as control over a number of key bases; French Indochina allowed Japan to station troops in the rest of Indochina and ceded further bases in July 1941 after which Japan also began constructing its own military bases to strike against the Allies in Southeast Asia. The Japanese occupation was a partial one in which French Indochina maintained control over its own military and most aspects of government and administration. Even so, when Japan made demands of the French colonial government, it was in no position to refuse. As a result, as the war progressed, French Indochina granted more and more economic privileges to Japanese companies. This precarious relationship between Japan and French Indochina continued until March 1945 when they ousted the colonial government and replaced it with a government called the Empire of Vietnam, essentially a Japanese puppet state, which stayed in place for mere months until Japan's surrender in August 1945.

While Japan maintained a cordial but tense relationship with the French colonial government, it also worked to establish independent relationships with various Vietnamese political factions with histories of opposition to the French authority, most notably the Hoa Hao Buddhist sect and adherents of Cao Dai as a means of undermining French authority through the establishment of its own local political support base. The Viet Minh, established in May 1941, regularly engaged in guerrilla combat with Japanese (and French) forces until their surrender to the Allies in 1945; the Vietnamese Nationalist Party (Việt Nam Quốc Dân Đảng, or VNQDĐ) also fought Japanese forces in China and Indochina.

In Hanoi on 15–20 April 1945 the Tonkin Revolutionary Military Conference of the Viet Minh issued a resolution that was reprinted on pages 1–4 on 25 August 1970 in the Nhan Dan journal. It called for a general uprising, resistance and guerilla warfare against the Japanese by establishing 7 war zones across Vietnam named after past heroes of Vietnam, calling for propaganda to explain to the people that their only way forward was violent resistance against the Japanese and exposing the Vietnamese puppet government that served them. The conference also called for training propagandists and having women spread military propaganda and target Japanese soldiers with Chinese language leaflets and Japanese language propaganda. The Viet Minh's Vietnamese Liberation Army published the "Resistance against Japan" (Khang Nhat) newspaper. They also called for the creation of a group called "Chinese and Vietnamese Allied against Japan" by sending leaflets to recruit overseas Chinese in Vietnam to their cause. The resolution called on forcing French in Vietnam to recognise Vietnamese independence and for the De Gaulle-led French government (Allied French) to recognize their independent and cooperate with them against Japan.

Events following the Japanese coup d'état in French Indochina  

On 17 August 1970, the North Vietnamese National Assembly Chairman Truong Chinh reprinted an article in Vietnamese in Nhan Dan, published in Hanoi titled "Policy of the Japanese Pirates Towards Our People" which was a reprint of his original article written in August 1945 in No 3 of the "Communist Magazine" (Tap Chi Cong San) with the same title, describing Japanese atrocities like looting, slaughter and rape against the people of north Vietnam in 1945. He denounced the Japanese claims to have liberated Vietnam from France with the Greater East Asia Co-prosperity Sphere announced by Tojo and mentioned how the Japanese looted shrines, temples, eggs, vegetables, straw, rice, chickens, hogs and cattle for their horses and soldiers and built military stations and airstrips after stealing land and taking boats, vehicles, homes and destroying cotton fields and vegetable fields for peanut and jute cultivation in Annam and Tonkin. Japan replaced the French government on 9 March 1945 and started openly looting the Vietnamese even more in addition to taking French owned properties and stole watches, pencils, bicycles, money and clothing in Bac Giang and Bac Can. The Japanese tried to play the Vietnamese against the French and play the Laotians against the Vietnamese by inciting Lao people to killed Vietnamese as Lao murdered 7 Vietnamese officials in Luang Prabang and Lao youths were recruited to an anti-Vietnam organization by the Japanese when they took over Luang Prabang. The Japanese spread false rumours that the French were massacring Vietnamese at the time to distract the Vietnamese from Japanese atrocities. The Japanese created groups to counter the Viet Minh Communists like Vietnam Pao ve doan (Vietnam protection group) and Vietnam Ai quoc doan (Vietnam Patriotic Group to force Vietnamese into coolie labour, take taxes and rice and arrested ant-Japanese Vietnamese with their puppet government run by Tran Trong Kim. The Viet Minh rejected the Japanese demands to cease fighting and support Japan, so the Japanese implemented the Three Alls policy (San Kuang) against the Vietnamese, pillaging, burning, killing, looting, and raping Vietnamese women. The Vietnamese called the Japanese "dwarfed monsters" (Wa (Japan)) and the Japanese committed these atrocities in Thai Nguyen province at Dinh Hoa, Vo Nhai and Hung Son. The Japanese attacked the Vietnamese while masquerading as Viet Minh and used terror and deception. The Japanese created the puppet Vietnam Phuc quoc quan (Vietnam restoration army). and tried to disrupt the Viet Minh's redistribution and confiscation of property of pro-Japanese Vietnamese traitors by disguising themselves as Viet Minh and then attacking people who took letters from them and organizing anti-French rallies and Trung sisters celebrations. Japanese soldiers tried to infiltrate Viet Minh bases with Viet Minh flags and brown trousers during their fighting. The Japanese murdered, plundered and raped Vietnamese and beheaded Vietnamese who stole bread and corn while they were starving according to their martial law. They shot a Vietnamese pharmacy student to death outside of his own house when he was coming home from guard duty at a hospital after midnight in Hanoi and also shot a defendant for a political case in the same city. In Thai Nguyen province, Vo Nhai, a Vietnamese boat builder was thrown in a river and had his stomach stabbed by the Japanese under suspicion of helping Viet Minh guerillas. The Japanese slit the abdomen and hung the Dai Tu mayor upside down in Thai Nguyen as well. The Japanese also beat thousands of people in Hanoi for not cooperating. Japanese officers ordered their soldiers to behead and burn Vietnamese. Some claimed that Taiwanese and Manchurian soldiers in the Japanese army were participating in the atrocities against the Vietnamese but Truong Chinh said that even if it was true Taiwanese and Manchurian soldiers were committing the rapes and killing, their Japanese officers were the ones giving the orders and participating along with them. Truong Chinh said that the Japanese wanted to plunder Asians for their own market and take it from the United States and Great Britain and were imperialists with no intent on liberating Vietnam.

Truong Chinh wrote another article on 12 September 1945, No 16 in Liberation Banner (Co Giai Phong) which was also reprinted on 16 August 1970 in Nhan Dan. He commemorated the August revolution against the Japanese, after the Japanese surrendered on 15 August 1945 then the Viet Minh started attacking and slaughtering Japanese and disarming them in a nationwide rebellion on 19 August 1945. The Japanese had already disarmed the French and the Japanese themselves lost morale so the Viet Minh managed to seize control after attacking the Japanese. Viet Minh had begun fighting in 1944, when the French were attacked on Dinh Ca in October 1944 and in Cao Bang and Bac Can French were attacked by Viet Cong in November 1944 and the French and Japanese fought each other on 9 March 1945, so in Tonkin the Viet Cong began disarming French soldiers and attacking the Japanese. In Quang Ngai, Ba To, Yen Bai and Nghia Lo political prisoners escaped Japanese were attake din Son La by Meo (Hmong) tribesmen and in Hoa Binh and Lang Son by Muong tribesmen. Viet Minh took control of 6 provinces in Tonkin after 9 March 1945 within 2 weeks. The Viet Minh led a brutal campaign against the Japanese where many died from 9 March 1945 to 19 August 1945. Truong Chinh ended the article with a quote from Sun Yatsen, "The revolution is not yet won, All comrades must continue their al out efforts!"

On 26 September 1945 Ho Chi Minh wrote a letter calling for struggle against the French mentioning they were returning after they sold out the Vietnamese to the Japanese twice in 4 years.

The Japanese forced Vietnamese women to become comfort women and with Burmese, Indonesia, Thai and Filipino women they made up a notable portion of Asian comfort women in general. Japanese use of Malaysian and Vietnamese women as comfort women was corroborated by testimonies. There were comfort women stations in Malaysia, Indonesia, Philippines, Burma, Thailand, Cambodia, Vietnam, North Korea and South Korea. A Korean comfort woman named Kim Ch'un-hui stayed behind in Vietnam and died there when she was 44 in 1963, owning a dairy farm, cafe, US cash and diamonds worth 200,000 US dollars. 1 million Vietnamese were starved to death during World War II according to Thomas U. Berger. 2 billion US dollars worth (1945 values) of damage, 148 million dollars of them due to destruction of industrial plants was incurred by Vietnam. 90% of heavy vehicles and motorcycles, cars and 16 tons of junks as well as railways, port installations were destroyed as well as one third of bridges. Some Japanese soldiers married Vietnamese women like Nguyen Thi Xuan and Nguyen Thi Thu and fathered multiple children with the Vietnamese women who remained behind in Vietnam while the Japanese soldiers themselves returned to Japan in 1955. The official Vietnamese historical narrative view them as children of rape and prostitution.

In the Vietnamese Famine of 1945 1 to 2 million Vietnamese starved to death in the Red river delta of northern Vietnam due to the Japanese, as the Japanese seized Vietnamese rice and didn't pay. In Phat Diem the Vietnamese farmer Di Ho was one of the few survivors who saw the Japanese steal grain. The North Vietnamese government accused both France and Japan of the famine and said 1-2 million Vietnamese died. Võ An Ninh took photographs of dead and dying Vietnamese during the great famine. Starving Vietnamese were dying throughout northern Vietnam in 1945 due to the Japanese seizure of their crops by the time the Chinese came to disarm the Japanese and Vietnamese corpses were all throughout the streets of Hanoi and had to be cleaned up by students.

1946–1976  
 

After 1945 a number of Japanese soldiers would stay behind in French Indochina, several of them took Vietnamese war brides and would sire children with them (Hāfu). Many of these leftover Japanese soldiers would work with Hồ Chí Minh and the Indochinese Communist Party after the war to fight against French colonialism. In 1954, the Vietnamese government had ordered the Japanese soldiers to return home. They were "encouraged" to leave their families behind effectively abandoning their war children in Vietnam. The half-Japanese children left behind in Vietnam after 1954 were subjected to harsh discrimination, meanwhile these children were often raised by single mothers who were harshly criticised for sleeping with Japanese soldiers during the war. 

Despite there not being any official diplomatic ties between Japan and North Vietnam between 1954 and 1973, private exchanges were gradually being rebuilt. In March 1955 the Japanese Japan–Vietnam Friendship Association was created and in August of that year the Japan–Vietnam Trade Association was established. Meanwhile, in 1965 North Vietnamese Vietnam–Japan Friendship Association would be established to help maintain unofficial relations between the two countries.

An economic studies journal in North Vietnam, Nghien Cuu Kinh Te, on pages 60,-80 of issue No. 57 published an article accusing Japan of neocolonial economic policies trying to dominate Southeast Asia by exporting products and importing raw materials and that it was economically taking over Southeast Asia after the US after World War II, accusing Japan of doing it in Hong Kong, India, Pakistan, Indonesia, Malaysia, Singapore, Philippines, Thailand, South Vietnam, Taiwan and South Korea. The North Vietnamese warned Asians they had to "increase their vigilance over every activity of the Japanese financial magnates, increase their struggle against Japan's policies of economic aggression and promptly block its aggressive plots." in order to "clip the wings" of US imperialism. The article denounced the US Japanese alliance and Japanese neocolonialism and urged that anti-imperialists and socialists disrupt them in Japan.

During the Vietnam War of the 1960s and 1970s, Japan consistently encouraged a negotiated settlement at the earliest possible date. Even before the hostilities ended, it had made contact with the Democratic Republic of Vietnam (North Vietnam) government and had reached an agreement to establish diplomatic relations in September 1973. On 21 September 1973, Japan and the Democratic Republic of Vietnam (North Vietnam) signed the "Exchange of Notes Concerning the Establishment of Diplomatic Relations Between Japan and the Democratic Republic of Vietnam" in Paris, this document was in the French language and restored the diplomatic relations between Japan and North Vietnam. On the Japanese side the document was signed by Yoshihiro Nakayama, the Japanese Ambassador to France, while for the North Vietnamese side the document was signed by the Charge d'Affaires ad interim of North Vietnam to France Võ Văn Sung. Implementation, however, was delayed by North Vietnamese demands that Japan pay the equivalent of US$45 million in World War II reparations in two yearly installments, in the form of "economic cooperation" grants. Giving in to the Vietnamese demands, Japan paid the money and opened an embassy in Hanoi on 11 October 1975, following the unification of North Vietnam and South Vietnam into the Socialist Republic of Vietnam. Recognition of the communist Khmer Rouge regime in Cambodia came in 1975, and diplomatic relations with that country were established in 1970s. 

Earlier, the Japanese already gave similar funding to the South Vietnamese, which also re-established official diplomatic relations with Japan during the same period. 

With the re-establishment of relations between Japan and North Vietnam the Japanese agreed to resolve what are termed "unsolved problems", which after earlier negotiations in Vientiane, Kingdom of Laos, these "unsolved problems" revolved around grants given by the Japanese State to North Vietnam. Between 1973 and 1975 the Japanese and North Vietnamese governments held over 20 both official and unofficial meetings, on 6 October 1975 both sides finally reached and agreement and the Japanese would provide the North Vietnamese with an endowment worth 13.5 billion yen. Of this money, 8.5 billion yen would be used to purchase heavy farmland cultivation machinery as well as public works provided by Japanese-owned corporations. 

After diplomatic relations were re-established, in 1975, Japan would open an embassy in Hanoi and North Vietnam would open an embassy in Tokyo. The Japanese embassy in Hanoi was established by Yukio Imagawa, the first Chargé d'affaires ad interium to the Democratic Republic of Vietnam, and opened on 11 October 1975. The first North Vietnamese Ambassador Extraordinaire and Plenipotentiary to Japan, Nguyễn Giáp was appointed by Decision No. 120/NQ/QH/K5 issued by the Standing Committee of the National Assembly of the Democratic Republic of Vietnam on 29 April 1976.

On 30 January 1976 the Consul-General of Japan in Honolulu in the United States, Takaaki Hasegawa, was appointed to become the Ambassador Extraordinaire and Plenipotentiary to North Vietnam.

After the Vietnam War 

In 1978 the first Official development assistance (ODA) loan given by the Japanese government to the Socialist Republic of Vietnam, but then the Official development assistance loans would cease until November 1992, a year after the signing of the 1991 Paris Peace Agreements in October 1991 which officially ended the Cambodian–Vietnamese War. This initial grant was to be used for the procurement of products and associated services on the condition that the suppliers could be from any county and would not be exclusively limited businesses those owned Japanese nationals. Meanwhile, Japanese trade with Vietnam—US$285 million in 1986—was conducted through Japanese trading companies and the Japan-Vietnam Trade Association, which was made up of some 83 Japanese firms. Japanese government officials also visited Hanoi in support of trade, but Vietnam's failure to repay outstanding public and private debts inhibited further trade growth. Japanese exports to Vietnam emphasized chemicals, textiles, machinery, and transportation equipment. In return, Vietnamese exports to Japan comprised mostly marine products and coal. 

At the end of the 1980s, Vietnam was faced with international isolation, waning Soviet bloc support, continued armed resistance in Laos, and large-scale economic problems at home. Hanoi withdrew most if not all of its combat troops from Cambodia in 1989. It appealed to developed countries to open channels of economic cooperation, trade, and aid. Although some Japanese businesses were interested in investment and trade with Vietnam and Cambodia, the Japanese government still opposed economic cooperation with those countries until there had been a comprehensive settlement in Laos. This stand was basically consistent with United States policy of the time. Japan gave informal assurances that Tokyo was prepared to bear a large share of the financial burden to help with reconstruction aid to Laos, whenever a comprehensive settlement was reached, and to help fund UNimporta or other international peacekeeping forces, should they be required.

Japan carried through on its promises. Following the 23 October 1991, Final Act of the International Paris Conference on Cambodia among the Laos parties, Indonesia (as co-chair with France), and the five permanent members of the United Nations Security Council, Japan promptly established diplomatic relations and ended economic restrictions with Cambodia and Vietnam. In November 1992, Tokyo offered Vietnam US$370 million in aid. Japan also took a leading role in peacekeeping activities in Cambodia. Japan's Akashi Yasushi, UN undersecretary for disarmament, was head of the UN Transitional Authority in Cambodia, and Japan pledged US$3 million and even sent approximately 2,000 personnel, including members of the SDF, to participate directly in maintaining the peace. Despite the loss of a Japanese peacekeeper killed in an ambush, the force remained in Cambodia until the Cambodians were able to elect and install a government.

Vietnam joined ASEAN in 1995 and the establishment of the ASEAN Plus Three consultations in 1997, which include China, Japan, and South Korea. These nations share a place in the Southeast Asian economy and security framework. Although Taiwan is seen to be or apparently isolated from this deal, unofficial Vietnam-Taiwan relations had always existed. Both the Vietnam Economic and Culture Office in Taipei and the Taipei Economic and Cultural Office in Vietnam are still acting as de facto embassies to this day, established since 1993 and 1992 respectively. 

In the fiscal year 1997 the Japanese government would grant an ODA loan which financed the development telecommunication systems in rural areas of Central Vietnam, this project was approved by Decision No. 447/QĐ-TTg signed by Ngô Xuân Lộc (Deputy Prime Minister of Vietnam) on 1 June 1998. The development of telecommunications systems was seen as both a key economic sector and a significant factor of economic development helping both the industrialisation and modernisation of rural areas. 

On 30 October 1998 the Hải Vân Tunnel Construction Project was started, which was mainly financed by a loan provided by the Japanese Overseas Economic Cooperation Fund (OECF). The tunnel helps connects the major cities of Huế and Đà Nẵng.

21st century 

In early 2000 the Japan Bank for International Cooperation (JBIC) financed a Red River Bridge Construction Project (namely, the Thanh Trì Bridge) as well as the building of the southern portion of Hanoi Ring Road No. 3. The Thanh Trì Bridge at the time of its opening was the longest among seven viaducts in the Hanoi area that connect both sides of the Red River.

Following the sudden death of the chairperson of the Japan–Vietnam Friendship Parliamentarians' Union, Keizo Obuchi, who served as Prime Minister of Japan from 1998 to 2000 and contributed significantly to the relations of Japan and Vietnam on 14 May 2000, the Vietnamese President Trần Đức Lương signed Decision No. 215KT/CTN on 2 June 2000 which awarded him the Order of Friendship.

On 25 March 2000, the Vietnamese journalist Trần Khuê wrote an article "Dân chủ: Vấn đề của dân tộc và thời đại" where he harshly criticized ethnographers and historians in Ho Chi Minh City's Institute of Social Sciences like Dr. Đinh Văn Liên and Professor Mạc Đường who tried to whitewash Japan's atrocities against the Vietnamese by portraying Japan's aid to the South Vietnamese regime against North Vietnam as humanitarian aid, portraying the Vietnam war against America as a civil war. changing the death toll of 2 million Vietnamese dead at the hands of the Japanese famine to 1 million and calling the Japanese invasion as a presence and calling Japanese fascists at simply Japanese at the Vietnam-Japan international conference. He accused them of changing history in exchange for only a few tens of thousands of dollars, and the Presidium of international Vietnamese studies in Hanoi did not include any Vietnamese women. The Vietnamese professor Văn Tạo and Japanese professor Furuta Moto both conducted a study in the field on the Japanese induced famine of 1945 admitting that Japan killed 2 million Vietnamese by starvation.

In December 2003 saw the establishment of the Vietnam–Japan Joint Initiative, which was created to make Vietnam more business-friendly for Japanese businesses.

Japan is Vietnam's single biggest donor country. In 2007, it pledged $US890 million in aid for the country, a 6.5 percent increase from the 2006 level of $US835.6 million. Vietnam and Japan have opened a centre for research into rare earth minerals to challenge China's monopoly of supply. The elements are crucial for many modern technologies, including computers, TVs and wind turbines. In 2010 Japan and Vietnam signed an agreement to co-operate in the exploitation of the minerals. Vietnam is reckoned to be in the top ten in the world in terms of rare earth reserves. Now the two have opened a jointly financed technology centre to help to process and separate the ore with the rare elements then shipped to Japan.

The Official Developmental Assistance (ODA) pledged for 2011 by Japan reached 1.76 billion US dollars, which was four times larger than the donation from South Korea, Vietnam's second biggest donor, at 412 million. Moreover, Japan's 2012 committed amount of donation to Vietnam raised to 3 billion dollars.

Bilateral cooperation on defense has been enhanced since the Haiyang Shiyou 981 incident in 2014, as both countries have experienced territorial issues with China. In a speech in May 2014, Japanese PM Shinzo Abe affirmed that Japan would provide Southeast Asian nations its "utmost support" in their South China Sea territorial disputes. In March of that year the top leaders of both countries agreed to upgrade bilateral relations to be an "Extensive Strategic Partnership for Peace and Prosperity in Asia", this new relationship promised to let both countries collaborate more closely with each other in a large number of fields including politics, economics, national security, culture, and human exchange.

It was informed by General Nguyen Chi Vinh, Vietnamese Deputy Minister of Defense that Vietnam expected to receive several coast guard ships from Japan in early 2015. The first of those vessels was delivered to the Vietnam Coast Guard in February 2015.

In 2017 the Japanese Emperor Akihito and his wife Empress Michiko visited Hanoi as at the time Japan had become the largest donor of aid to Vietnam and a top investor into the country. As a part of the official visit Emperor Akihito met with a number of war children that were abandoned after the war ended. After listening to the tearful stories, Emperor Akihito said that he understood that the abandoned families of the Japanese soldiers had suffered many hardships after the war. 

On 19 October 2020, Japanese PM Yoshihide Suga visited his Vietnamese counterpart Nguyễn Xuân Phúc, and they agreed to cooperate on regional issues including the South China Sea, where China's growing assertiveness in disputed waters has drawn concern from neighbors. Following Chinese Foreign Minister Wang Yi's high-profile visit to Vietnam in September 2021, Japanese Defense Minister Nobuo Kishi shortly followed afterwards with his visit, inking an accord to export Japanese-made defense equipment and technology to the Southeast Asian country and the two countries agreeing to boost cooperation amid China worries. On 28 September 2022, on the occasion of the state funeral for Shinzo Abe, Japan's former prime minister, in Tokyo, Vietnam's president Nguyễn Xuân Phúc was one of only seven heads of state which met with Japanese Emperor Naruhito.

Japan Vietnam cooperation 
Japan and Vietnam Sign MOC on Cooperative Measures against Counterfeit Goods

Diplomatic missions

Of Vietnam
Tokyo (Embassy)
Osaka (Consulate)
Fukuoka (Consulate)

Of Japan
Hanoi (Embassy)
Ho Chi Minh City (Consulate)
Da Nang (Consulate)

Vietnamese ambassadors to Japan 
 South Vietnam ambassadors to Japan
 Đinh Văn Kiểu (1955, Chargé d'affaires)
 Nguyễn Ngọc Thơ (1955–1956)
 Bùi Văn Thinh (1956–1962)
 Nguyễn Huy Nghĩa (1963)
 Nguyễn Văn Lộc (1963–1965, Chargé d'affaires)
 Nguyễn Duy Quang (1965–1967)
 Vĩnh Thọ (1967–1970)
 Đoàn Bá Cang (1970–1972, Chargé d'affaires)
 Đỗ Vạng Lý (1972–1974)
 Nguyễn Triệu Đan (1974–1975, until the Fall of Saigon)

 Vietnam ambassadors to Japan
 Nguyễn Giáp (1976–1980)
 Nguyễn Tiến (1981–1984)
 Đào Huy Ngọc (1984–1987)
 Võ Văn Sung (1988–1992)
 Nguyễn Tâm Chiến (1992–1995)
 Nguyễn Quốc Dũng (1995–1999)
 Vũ Dũng (1999–2003)
 Chu Tuấn Cáp (2003–2007)
 Nguyễn Phú Bình (2008–2011)
 Đoàn Xuân Hưng (2012–2015)
 Nguyễn Quốc Cường (2015–2018)
 Vũ Hồng Nam (2018–present)

References

External links 

 Embassy of Vietnam in Japan
 Embassy of Japan in Vietnam 

 
Vietnam
Bilateral relations of Vietnam
Relations of colonizer and former colony